The 2018–19 Slovak Extraliga season was the 26th season of the Slovak Extraliga, the highest level of ice hockey in Slovakia.
HK Orange 20 is a project to prepare the Slovakia junior ice hockey team for the IIHF World U20 Championship. The team does not play a complete regular season and cannot advance to the playoffs or get relegated. Since the 2018–19 season, the league also includes two teams from Hungary.

Regular season

Standings
Each team played 55 games, playing each of the other eleven teams five times. Points were awarded for each game, where three points are awarded for winning in regulation time, two points for winning in overtime or shootout, one point for losing in overtime or shootout, and zero points for losing in regulation time. At the end of the regular season, the team that finishes with the most points was crowned the league champion.

Statistics

Scoring leaders

The following players led the league in points, at the conclusion of the regular season.

Leading goaltenders
The following goaltenders led the league in goals against average, provided that they have played at least 40% of their team's minutes, at the conclusion of the regular season.

Relegation series
Relegation series played between MsHK Žilina, the 12th team in regular season, and HK Dukla Michalovce, the winner of 1.liga. The winner of best-of-seven series played in Extraliga in 2019–20 season.

PlayOut

Michalovce wins the series 4-3 and will play in 2019–20 Slovak Extraliga season

Playoffs
Ten teams qualify for the playoffs: the top six teams in the regular season have a bye to the quarterfinals, while teams ranked seventh to tenth meet each other (7 versus 10, 8 versus 9) in a preliminary playoff round.

Bracket

Wild card round

Quarter-finals

Semi-finals

Finals

Final rankings

References

External links
Official website

Slovak Extraliga seasons
Slovak
2018–19 in Slovak ice hockey leagues